Skáldskaparmál (Old Norse: 'The Language of Poetry'; c. 50,000 words;) is the second part of the Prose Edda.

The section consists of a dialogue between Ægir, the divine personification of the sea, and Bragi, the god of poetry, in which both Norse mythology and discourse on the nature of poetry are intertwined. The origin of a number of kennings is given; then Bragi delivers a systematic list of kennings for various people, places and things. He then goes on to discuss poetic language in some detail, in particular heiti, the concept of poetical words which are non-periphrastic (like steed for horse), and again systematises these. This in a way forms an early form of poetic thesaurus.

References

Bibliography

Further reading 

 Anthony Faulkes, "The sources of Skáldskaparmál: Snorri’s intellectual background", in: Alois Wolf (ed.), Snorri Sturluson, Volume 51 of ScriptOralia, Gunter Narr Verlag (1993), 59–76.

External links
Editions 
Sveinbjörn Egilsson (ed.) Edda Snorra Sturlusonar:: eða Gylfaginníng, Skáldskaparmál og Háttatal (1848), 45–143.
Guðni Jónsson (ed.), Eddukvaeði,Íslendingasagnaútgáfan  (1954) (heimskringla.no)
Anthony Faulkes (ed.), Edda; Skáldskaparmál, 2 volumes: vol. 1:  Introduction, Text and Notes, vol. 2:  Glossary and Index of Names, London (1998; 2007).

Translations

Rasmus Björn Anderson (trans.) (1872)
Arthur Gilchrist Brodeur (trans.) (1916)

Sources of Norse mythology
Old Norse prose
Skaldic poetry
Nibelung tradition
Works by Snorri Sturluson